Marie Elisabeth Kuylenstierna-Wenster (16 September 1869 – 13 February 1933) was a Swedish translator and writer, often writing under the pseudonym Sten Wide or using her initials E.K.W.. She studied abroad in France, Germany, and Denmark and wrote for several magazines in the period 1886-1913. She then became a French teacher and was a common lecturer at the municipality before she became a popular science lecturer in Lund. 

Elisabeth Keylenstierna-Wenster was known both as a lecturer and a critic on literature, and published 10+ collections of short stories, 20+ children's books, and around 50 novels concerning contemporary societal critique and historical novels. She translated around 70 novels, mainly from Danish.

References

Further reading 
 

1869 births
1933 deaths
Swedish women children's writers
Swedish children's writers
Swedish women novelists
Swedish translators
Translators to Swedish
Translators from Danish
19th-century Swedish novelists
19th-century Swedish women writers
19th-century translators
20th-century Swedish women writers
20th-century Swedish novelists
20th-century translators
Swedish women short story writers
Swedish short story writers
19th-century short story writers
20th-century short story writers
Swedish historical novelists
Women historical novelists